Carlos Coimbra (1925 – 14 February 2007) was a Brazilian film editor, director and screenwriter. His film A Morte Comanda o Cangaço was entered into the 11th Berlin International Film Festival.

Selected filmography
 A Morte Comanda o Cangaço (1961)

References

External links

1925 births
2007 deaths
Brazilian film editors
Brazilian film directors
Brazilian screenwriters
Writers from São Paulo
20th-century screenwriters